Charlotte Meadows is an American politician. She has served in the Alabama House of Representatives since 2019, after running unsuccessfully in 2013.

Political positions

Marijuana
Meadows filibustered and voted against a bill that legalized medical marijuana usage in Alabama. Meadows and a small group of other legislators spoke for nine hours in opposition to the bill–no attempt was made to cloture the members. In her speech, Meadows brought up the death of Rod Bramblett, who was killed in a car accident by a teenager who was under the influence.

Electoral history

2013

References 

Women state legislators in Alabama
Republican Party members of the Alabama House of Representatives
Living people
Year of birth missing (living people)
21st-century American women